Hurstbridge railway station is the terminus of the suburban electrified Hurstbridge line in Victoria, Australia. It serves the north-eastern Melbourne suburb of Hurstbridge, and opened on 25 June 1912 as Hurst's Bridge. It was renamed Hurstbridge on 9 December of that year.

History
Hurstbridge station opened on 25 June 1912, when the railway line was extended from Eltham. Like the suburb itself, the station was named after a local settler, Henry Hurst, who built a log bridge across the Diamond Creek to access a property named "Allwood".

In 1957, a goods train service between Eltham and Hurstbridge was withdrawn. In 1962, a siding that operated to a cool store was abolished.

Accidents and incidents
On 16 February 1973, Tait trailer carriage 202T was destroyed by a fire while stabled in No. 1 road.

On 9 April 1983, Comeng motor carriage 315M and Tait motor carriage 472M were destroyed by a fire whilst at the station. Both cars were later scrapped.

Shortly before 2:00 a.m. on 11 November 2015, X'Trapolis train set 927M-1664T-928M derailed, following an unauthorised movement from the yard, resulting in collisions with various items of infrastructure and another train. On 1 June 2016, a former Metro Trains worker pleaded guilty to causing the incident, along with lighting two fires at Newport Workshops in 2015, which damaged or destroyed heritage train carriages, including a historical Swing Door EMU.

Platforms and services
Hurstbridge has one platform. It is served by Hurstbridge line trains.

Platform 1:
  all stations and limited express services to Flinders Street

Transport Links
Panorama Coaches operates one route to and from Hurstbridge station, under contract to Public Transport Victoria:
 : to Greensborough station

Gallery

References

External links
 
 Melway map

Premium Melbourne railway stations
Railway stations in Melbourne
Railway stations in Australia opened in 1912
Railway stations in the Shire of Nillumbik